Albibacter is a genus in the phylum Pseudomonadota (Bacteria).

Etymology
The name Albibacter derives from:Latin adjective albus, white; New Latin masculine gender noun, bacter, nominally meaning "a rod", but in effect meaning a bacterium, rod; New Latin masculine gender noun Albibacter, white rod.

See also
 Bacterial taxonomy
 Microbiology

References 

Methylocystaceae
Monotypic bacteria genera
Bacteria genera